Aubrey William de Vere Beauclerk (1801 – 1854) was a Radical British Member of Parliament (MP), who was elected to serve the dual-member East Surrey, making contributions in the Commons between 1833 and 1837, when he did not stand for re-election. One of his great-grandfathers was a younger son of the 1st Duke of St Albans (paternal-line-only), two of the others were the 3rd Duke of Marlborough and 2nd Duke of Richmond.

Domestic life 

Beauclerk, born on 20 February 1801, was the son of Charles George Beauclerk and Emily Charlotte Ogilvie. His patrilineal great-grandfather was a younger son of the 1st Duke of St Albans, two of those on other lines were the 3rd Duke of Marlborough and 2nd Duke of Richmond, the latter through his mother.   He was a political radical, active in the reform movement.  He lived at Ardglass Castle in County Down, Ireland, the mansion known as St. Leonard Lodge, Horsham and Cheltenham, England.

On 13 February 1834 he married Ida Goring and had three daughters and in 1837 a namesake, without middle name William, who died in 1919. She drowned in the pond at St Leonard's mansion on 23 April 1839; the jury and coroner met the next day at the house and found she might have accidentally fallen, being at times accustomed to giddiness. On 7 December 1841 he married Rose Matilda Robinson and they had two daughters. He admitted to an illegitimate son, born 1823,  Charles Beauclerk of army captain rank, curate of four parishes in Ulster then vicar (1869-1875) of St Mary's Church, Belfast, then chaplain at Boulogne.

Two of Beauclerk's children died before aged 20, the remainder lived well into adulthood.

Beauclerk has been romantically involved with the nineteenth-century writer Mary Shelley.

He died on 1 February 1854 at Ardglass Castle, which he inherited from William Ogilvie his grandfather, and was buried in his family vault at the parish church.

Career 
A former army major, he was a Member of Parliament (MP) for East Surrey from 1832 to 1837. He was co-member for this area on its inception in December 1832. Hansard shows, from him, 114 speeches or questions spanning 1833 to 1837.

As an MP he supported the mainstream radical causes of the time, including the abolition of slavery, achieved in 1833 (with an until early 1840s process of indenturing particularly abroad in the Empire preceding many of the slaves' freedom) and of tithes, achieved in 1836 by way of a payoff and negligible payments system (commutation for a sum and apportionment of rentchange). He believed in a small, fixed duty (trade tariff) on corn, sought Anglican Church reform and an end to taxes on knowledge. Beauclerk was the only person, according to a letter from Mary Shelley to Claire Clairmont, to support Shelley's son Percy Florence Shelley's bid to become MP.

He was with two others appointed by the Irish Assize judges as High Sheriff of County Down for 1839, 1852, and 1853.

Ancestry

See also
Corn Laws
Reform Act 1832
Tithe Commutation Act 1836

Notes and references

External links 
 
 UK Parliamentary Archives, Letters from Major AW Beauclerk MP

1801 births
1854 deaths
Liberal Party (UK) MPs for English constituencies
UK MPs 1832–1835
UK MPs 1835–1837
Aubrey